The International Churches of Christ (ICOC) is a body of decentralized, co-operating, religiously conservative and racially integrated Christian congregations. Beginning with 30 members, they grew to 37,000 members within the first 12 years. In June 2022, the ICOC numbered their members at 118,094. A formal break was made from the Churches of Christ in 1993 with the organization of the International Churches of Christ. The ICOC believes that the whole Bible is the inspired word of God.

It is a family of churches which are located in 147 nations. They consider themselves non-denominational. They are structured with the intent to avoid two extremes: "overly centralised authority" on the one side and "disconnected autonomy" on the other side. In 2000, it was described as "[a] fast-growing Christian organization known for aggressive proselytizing to [US] college students" and as "one of the most controversial religious groups on campus". The largest congregation, the Los Angeles Church of Christ, has over 6000 members. The largest church service was held in 2012 at the AT&T Center in San Antonio, Texas, during a World Discipleship Summit, with 17,800 in attendance.

Experts on cults, former members, and formers members who were victims of sexual abuse while they were still members of the ICOC have characterized the ICOC as being a cult.

History

Origins in the Stone-Campbell Movement

The ICoC has its roots in a movement that reaches back to the period of the Second Great Awakening (1790–1870) of early nineteenth-century America. Barton W. Stone and Alexander Campbell are credited with what is today known as the Stone-Campbell or Restoration Movement. There are a number of branches of the Restoration movement and the ICoC was formed from within the Churches of Christ. Specifically, it was born from a "discipling" movement that arose among the Churches of Christ during the 1970s. This discipling movement developed in the campus ministry of Chuck Lucas.

In 1967, Chuck Lucas was minister of the 14th Street Church of Christ in Gainesville, Florida (later renamed the Crossroads Church of Christ). That year he started a new project known as Campus Advance (based on principles borrowed from the Campus Crusade and the Shepherding Movement). Centered on the University of Florida, the program called for a strong evangelical outreach and an intimate religious atmosphere in the form of soul talks and prayer partners. Soul talks were held in student residences and involved prayer and sharing overseen by a leader who delegated authority over group members. Prayer partners  referred to the practice of pairing a new Christian with an older guide for personal assistance and direction. Both procedures led to "in-depth involvement of each member in one another's lives".

The ministry grew as younger members appreciated many of the new emphases on commitment and models for communal activity. This activity became identified by many with the forces of radical change in the larger American society that characterized the late sixties and seventies. The campus ministry in Gainesville thrived and sustained strong support from the elders of the local congregation in the 'Crossroads Church of Christ'. By 1971, as many as a hundred people a year were joining the church. Most notable was the development of a training program for potential campus ministers. By the mid-seventies, a number of young men and women had been trained to replicate the philosophy and methods of the Crossroads Church in other places.

From Gainesville to Boston: 1970s–1980s
Among the early converts at Gainesville was a student named Kip McKean who had been personally mentored by Chuck Lucas. Thomas 'Kip' McKean, born in Indianapolis, Indiana,  
completed a degree while training at Crossroads and afterward served as campus minister at several Churches of Christ locations. By 1979 his ministry grew from a few individuals to over three hundred making it the fastest growing Church of Christ campus ministry in America. McKean then moved to Massachusetts, where he took over the leadership of the Lexington Church of Christ (soon to be called the Boston Church of Christ). Building on Lucas' initial strategies, McKean only agreed to lead the church in Lexington as long as every member agreed to be 'totally committed'. The church grew from 30 members to 3,000 in just over 10 years in what became known as the 'Boston Movement'.

While still a Church of Christ congregation, they differentiated themselves through high levels of commitment, accountability, mentorship and a numerical focus on conversions. Meanwhile, the center of the new philosophy of ministry training and evangelism began to shift from Florida to Massachusetts. Moreover, the relationship between The Boston Church of Christ and larger CoC became more and more strained. During this period, Boston Movement leaders had begun to 'reconstruct'  existing congregations. This began to cause a tension with the larger Church of Christ leadership that would eventually lead to a complete split. Parallel to this, the Boston Church of Christ began to plant new congregations at unprecedented speed for the Church of Christ at the time. The Boston congregation sent church plantings to Chicago and London in 1982, New York shortly thereafter, and Johannesburg in June 1986.

In 1985 a Church of Christ minister and professor, Dr. Flavil Yeakley, administered the Myers-Briggs Type Indicator test to the Boston Church of Christ (BCC), the founding church of the ICOC. Yeakley passed out three MBTI tests, which asked members to perceive their past, current, and five-year in the future personality types.  While over 900 members were tested, 835 individuals completed all three forms.  A majority of those respondents changed their perceived or imagined personality type scores on the three tests in convergence with a single type.  After completing the study, Yeakley observed that "The data in this study of the Boston Church of Christ does not prove that any certain individual has actually changed his or her personality in an unhealthy way. The data, however, does prove that there is a group dynamic operating in that congregation that influences its members to change their personalities to conform to the group norm".
 
By the end of 1988 the churches in the Boston Movement were for all practical purposes a distinct fellowship, initiating a fifteen-year period during which there would be little contact between the CoC and the Boston Movement. By 1988, McKean was regarded as the leader of the movement. It was at this time that the Boston church initiated its program of outreach to the poor called HopeWorldwide. Also in 1988 McKean, finding that running the organization single-handedly had become unwieldy, selected a handful of men that he and Elena, his wife, had personally trained and named them World Sector Leaders. In 1989 mission teams were officially sent out to Tokyo, Honolulu, Washington, DC, Manila, Miami, Seattle, Bangkok, and Los Angeles.  That year, McKean and his family moved to Los Angeles to lead the new church planted some months earlier. Within a few years Los Angeles, not Boston, was the fulcrum of the movement.

The ICoC: 1990s

In 1990 the Crossroads Church of Christ broke with the movement and, through a letter written to The Christian Chronicle, attempted to restore relations with the Churches of Christ.  By the early 1990s some first-generation leaders had become disillusioned by the movement and left.  The movement was first recognized as an independent religious group in 1992 when John Vaughn, a church growth specialist at Fuller Theological Seminary, listed them as a separate entity. TIME magazine ran a full-page story on the movement in 1992 calling them "one of the world's fastest-growing and most innovative bands of Bible thumpers" that had grown into "a global empire of 103 congregations from California to Cairo with total Sunday attendance of 50,000". A formal break was made from the Churches of Christ in 1993 when the group organized under the name "International Churches of Christ."  This new designation formalized a division that was already in existence between those involved with the Crossroads/Boston Movement and "original" Churches of Christ. Growth in the ICOC was not without criticism. Other names that have been used for this movement include the "Crossroads movement," "Multiplying Ministries," and the "Discipling Movement". Since each city had a single church, its membership might be large and geographically disperse; if so, it was divided into regions and then sectors of perhaps a few small suburban communities. This governing system attracted criticism as overly-authoritarian, although the ICOC denied this charge.  "It's not a dictatorship," said Al Baird, former ICOC spokesperson; "It's a theocracy, with God on top."

Growth continued globally and in 1996 the independent organisation "Church Growth Today" named the Los Angeles ICoC as the fastest growing Church in North America for the second year running and another eight ICOC churches were in the top 100. By 1999, the Los Angeles church reached a Sunday attendance of 14,000.  By 2001, the ICOC was an independent worldwide movement that had grown from a small congregation to 125,000 members and had planted a church in nearly every country of the world in a period of twenty years.

The ICoC: 2000s
Once the fastest-growing Christian movement in the United States, membership growth slowed during the later half of the 1990s. In 2000, the ICOC announced the completion of its six-year initiative to establish a church in every country with a population over 100,000. In spite of this, numerical growth continued to slow. Beginning in the late 1990s, problems arose as McKean's moral authority as the leader of the movement came into question. Expectations for continued numerical growth and the pressure to sacrifice financially to support missionary efforts took its toll. Added to this was the loss of local leaders to new planting projects. In some areas, decreases in membership began to occur. At the same time, realization was growing that the accumulated costs of McKean's leadership style and associated disadvantages were outweighing the benefits. In 2001, McKean's leadership weaknesses were affecting his family, with all of his children disassociating themselves from the church, and he was asked by a group of long-standing elders in the ICoC to take a sabbatical from overall leadership of the ICoC. On 12 November 2001, McKean, who had led the International Churches of Christ, issued a statement that he was going to take a sabbatical from his role of leadership in the church:

 Nearly a year later, in November 2002 he resigned from the office and personally apologized citing arrogance, anger and an over-focus on numerical goals as the source of his decision.

Referring to this event, McKean said:

The period following McKean's departure included a number of changes in the ICoC. Some changes were initiated from the leaders themselves and others brought through members. Most notable was Henry Kriete, a leader in the London ICoC, who circulated an open letter detailing his feelings about theological exclusivism and authority in the ICoC. This letter affected the ICoC for the decade after McKean's resignation.

Critics of the ICOC claim that Kip McKean's resignation sparked numerous problems.  However, others have noted that since McKean's resignation the ICOC has made numerous changes.  The Christian Chronicle, a newspaper for the Churches of Christ, reports that the ICOC has changed its leadership and discipling structure. According to the paper, "the ICOC has attempted to address the following concerns: a top down hierarchy, discipling techniques, and sectarianism". In the years following McKean's resignation, the central leadership was replaced with "the co-operation agreement" with over 90% of the churches affirming to this new system of global co-ordination.

Over time, McKean attempted to re-assert his leadership over the ICOC, yet was rebuffed. The Elders, Evangelists and Teachers wrote a letter to McKean expressing concern that there had been "no repentance" from his publicly acknowledged leadership weaknesses. McKean then began to criticize some of the changes that were being made, as he did in the 1980s toward Mainline Churches of Christ. After attempting to divide the ICOC he was disfellowshipped in 2006 and founded a church that he called the International Christian Church.

The ICOC: 2020 plans

In 2010 the Evangelists Service Team formulated a "2020 vision plan", that all the regional families of churches have a plan to evangelize their geographic area of the world. The plan encompasses the need to strengthen existing small churches and plant new churches.

They plan to build and strengthen those churches through a "best-practices" approach to ministry: oversee and support those churches through strong regional relationships and provide additional training for their ministers and congregations through the newly formed "Ministry Training Academy" being rolled out across the world, and provide global co-ordination and co-operation through "Service Teams" that specialize in "Campus Ministry", "Youth & Family Ministry" and other specialized ministries.

Church governance

The International churches of Christ are a family of over 700 independent churches in 155 nations around the world. The 700 churches form 34 Regional Families of churches that oversee mission work in their respective geographic areas of influence. Each regional family of churches sends Evangelists, Elders and Teachers to an annual leadership conference, where delegates meet to pray, plan and co-operate world evangelism. Mike Taliaferro, from San Antonio Texas, says "The co-operation plan is a far better way of co-ordinating and unifying a church family of the size and global nature of the ICOC. No longer can one man make sweeping decisions that affect all the churches, considering that many of those churches he may never have visited. Building unity and consensus through prayer and discussion takes time but is worth it. The spiritual fruit of the Delegates Conference in Budapest is testimony to the success of this much less authoritarian approach to that which we had in the past." "Service Teams" provide global leadership and oversight. The Service Teams consists of an Elders, Evangelists, Teachers, Youth & Family, Campus, Singles, Communications & Administration, and HOPEww & Benevolence teams.

One church
The ICOC holds that the Bible teaches the existence of a single universal church. One implication of this doctrine is that, while Christians may separate themselves into different, disunified churches (as opposed to just geographically separated congregations), it is not actually biblically right to do so.  While no one claims to know who exactly is part of "the universal church" and who is not, the ICOC believes that anyone who follows the plan of salvation as laid out in the scriptures is added by God to his "One Universal Church".

This is consistent with their historical roots in the Churches of Christ, which believe that Christ established only one church, and that the use of denominational creeds serves to foster division among Christians. This belief dates to the beginning of the Restoration Movement; Thomas Campbell expressed an ideal of unity in his Declaration and address: "The church of Jesus Christ on earth is essentially, intentionally, and constitutionally one."

Ministry Training Academy
The current education and ministerial training program in the ICOC is the Ministry Training Academy (MTA).  The MTA consists of twelve core courses that are divided into three areas of study: biblical knowledge, spiritual development, and ministry leadership. Each course requires at least 12 hours of classroom study in addition to course work. An MTA student who completes the twelve core classes  receives a certificate of completion.

HOPE worldwide
The ICOC directly administers or partners with over a dozen organizations. Some function as appendages of the church; others are entirely unrelated in their mission and activities. Of these, the largest and most well-known is HOPE worldwide, a charitable foundation started as the benevolent arm of the ICOC, which serves as the primary beneficiary of the church's charitable donations for the poor. Begun in 1991 with three projects in three countries and a budget of $600,000, as of 2012, HOPEww has grown to operate in 80 countries, serving 2,500,000 needy people each year, with an annual budget of $40,000,000.

 In Africa, their projects serve 148,000 orphans in eight countries.
 In North America, there are 120 chapters of HOPEww, which mobilized 1300 volunteers to serve victims of Hurricane Sandy.
 In Central America, 53,000 pediatric exams and 58,000 adult medical exams have been conducted with 23,000 prescriptions written.
 In Cambodia, HOPEww runs and staffs two free hospitals, the Sihanouk Hospital Center of HOPE and the Sonja Kill Memorial Hospital.
 In Bolivia, Hospital Arco Iris provides $1.4 million in free medical care.
 In March 2022, HOPEww partnered with Heart to Heart International to distribute $20 million of medicine and medical supplies.
According to Charity Navigator, America's largest independent charity evaluator, they have assigned HOPE Worldwide:
 An "Accountability & Transparency" rating of 100 out of 100.
 A "Financial" rating of 89.4 out of 100.
 An "Overall" rating of 4 out of 4 stars, with the Overall score of 89.4 out of 100.

ICOC's relationship with mainstream Churches of Christ 
With the resignation of McKean, some efforts at reconciliation between the International Churches of Christ and the mainstream Churches of Christ are being made. In March 2004, Abilene Christian University held the "Faithful Conversations" dialog between members of the Churches of Christ and International Churches of Christ. Those involved were able to apologize and initiate an environment conducive to building bridges. A few leaders of the Churches of Christ apologized for use of the word "cult" in reference to the International Churches of Christ. The International Churches of Christ leaders apologized for alienating the Churches of Christ and implying they were not Christians. Despite improvements in relations, there are still fundamental differences within the fellowship. Early 2005 saw a second set of dialogues with greater promise for both sides helping one another. Harding University is contemplating a distance learning program geared toward those ministers who were trained in the International Churches of Christ. A video chronicling the "First forty years of the ICOC" details these developments.

Beliefs and practices of the ICOC

Beliefs
The ICOC considers the Bible the inspired word of God. Through holding that their doctrine is based on the Bible alone, and not on creeds and traditions, they claim the distinction of being "non-denominational". They believe that anyone who follows the plan of salvation as laid out in the scriptures is saved by the grace of God. They are a family of over 700 churches spread across 155 nations of the World. They are racially integrated congregations made up of a diversity of people from various age groups, economic, and social backgrounds. They believe Jesus came to break down the dividing wall of hostility between the races and people groups of this world and unite mankind under the Lordship of Christ (Ephesians 2:11-22).

Like the Churches of Christ, the ICOC recognizes the Bible as the sole source of authority for the church and it also believes that the current denominational divisions are inconsistent with Christ's intent. Christians ought to be united.  The ICOC like the Christian Church, in contrast to the CoC, consider permissible practices that the New Testament does not expressly forbid.

Pepperdine University, affiliated with Churches of Christ, published a document in 2010 highlighting the core beliefs of the ICOC that are shared with its counterpart:

The ICOC teaches that "Christians are  saved by the grace of God, through faith in Christ, at baptism." The ICOC maintains that anyone, anywhere, who follows God's plan of salvation as found in the scriptures is saved.

The ICOC teaches on the basis of  that the "Sinner's Prayer" is not biblical. Steven Francis Staten argues that the sinner's prayer represents "a belief system and a salvation practice that no one had ever held until relatively recently." The evangelical preacher Francis Chan has made statements that contradict the sinner's prayer and emphasizes baptism and the Holy Spirit. David Platt, head pastor of The Church at Brook Hills and author of the book Radical  in an article in Christianity Today: "Is it possible for people to say they believe in Jesus, to say they have accepted Jesus, to say that they have received Jesus, but they are not saved and will not enter the kingdom of heaven? Is it possible? Absolutely, it's possible. It's not just possible; it is probable". While he affirmed that people calling out to God with repentant faith is fundamental to being saved, he said his comments about the "sinner's prayer" have been deeply motivated "by a concern for authentic conversions".

In agreement with the prevailing view in the Churches of Christ, the ICoC believes that it is necessary to have an understanding of Baptism's role in salvation.

Practices

Sunday worship

A typical Sunday morning service involves singing, praying, preaching, and the sacrament of the Lord's Supper. An unusual element of ICOC tradition is the lack of established church buildings. Congregations meet in rented spaces: hotel conference rooms, schools, public auditoriums, conference centers, small stadiums, or rented halls, depending on the number of parishioners.  Though the church is not static, neither is it "ad hoc" — the leased locale is converted into a Worship Facility. "From an organizational standpoint, it's a great idea", observes Boston University Chaplain Bob Thornburg. "They put very little money into buildings...You put your money into people who reach out to more people in order to help them become Christians."

This practice of not owning buildings changed when the Tokyo Church of Christ became the first ICOC church to build its own church building. This building was designed by the Japanese architect Fumihiko Maki. This became an example for other ICOC churches to follow suit.

One Year Challenge
To provide an international service opportunity for college-age students, the ICOC has a program called the "One Year Challenge" (OYC), where graduating students take a year off and go and serve another church in the Third World or a recently planted church in the First World looking to reach younger people with the gospel. The One Year Challenge program currently operates in ten countries, including: China, Taiwan, The Czech Republic, Hungary, Haiti, Bolivia, Brazil, Canada, The U.K. and The U.S.

Bible talks
A Bible Talk is a small group of disciples which usually holds meetings once a week. Bible Talks can hold meetings almost anywhere, they can hold meetings in college dormitories, in restaurants, and even in members' houses. Bible Talks, or 'Family Groups', are designed so disciples can read the Bible together and build relationships with others in the church. All of the members of the Bible Talks are encouraged to invite guests to their meetings as a way to introduce the guests to the Church in a more informal setting. The Bible Talk is very similar to the "cell group" or the "small group" structure which exists in many churches as a way to facilitate close relationships amongst their members.

Discipling
Disciples are student-followers of Jesus Christ.  The practice of discipling involves mentoring and accountability partnerships and is one of the central elements of the ICOC's beliefs. Members who have mentoring and accountability relationships believe that this practice is based upon and encouraged by Biblical passages like: Ecclesiastes 4:9-12; Proverbs 11:25; Proverbs 27:17; Hebrews 10:25; James 5:16 among others. They also cite numerous examples of such relationships found in scripture like Moses and Joshua, Elijah and Elisha, Jesus and the early disciples, Paul and Timothy.

Kip McKean, who was the leader of the ICOC until 2001, said:

The church's emphasis on discipling has not been without its critics. A number of ex-members have expressed problems with discipling in the ICOC. After the removal of McKean, the practice of "Discipleship Partners" has taken on a more "servant leadership approach". Michael Taliaferro explains in a survey of ICOC churches: "We fully recognize that discipleship partners today are (thankfully) much different than what many were experiencing 10 years ago.  We know that we blew it in this area in the past.  We also feel that we have grown.  As far as we know, no churches assign the partners (everyone chooses for themselves), and all respondents were very convinced about the need for relationships that are not harsh or bossy, but rather Biblically balanced, respectful, and mature."

US college campuses 

The ICOC has a history of over forty years of evangelizing on college campuses.  Each year an International Campus Ministry Conference (ICMC) is held for college students. In 2004, the ICMC in San Antonio there were 200 campus participants. In 2011, they had 2500 students meet in Denver, Colorado and Athens, Georgia   In 2013, the Campus Ministries of the ICOC raised $12,900 for "Chance for Africa", a charity that helps educate Primary and Secondary School children in Africa. The 2013 ICMC conferences were held in Orlando, Florida and San Diego with 2700 students in attendance. The students set a new World Record by holding a lightsaber battle with 1200 lightsabers being used, (bettering the old record by 200). These lightsabers were then donated to the underprivileged.

U.S. News & World Report ran an article in 2000 discussing proselytizing on college campuses. The article's author, Carolyn Kleiner, describes the ICOC as "[a] fast-growing Christian organization known for aggressive proselytizing to college students" and as "one of the most controversial religious groups on campus". Kleiner states that "some ex-members and experts on mind-control assert [it] is a cult". Furthermore, "[a]t least 39 institutions, including Harvard and Georgia State, have outlawed the organization at one time or another for violating rules against door-to-door recruiting, say, or harassment." In response to the question "A zealous group to be sure, but is it a cult?", U.S. News & World Report also quotes ICOC spokesperson Al Baird, who says "We're no more a cult than Jesus was a cult" and Professor Jeffrey K. Hadden, who agrees with Baird, saying "every new religion experiences a high level of tension with society because its beliefs and ways are unfamiliar. But most, if they survive, we come to accept as part of the religious landscape".

At the University of Southern California, the school newspaper ran an article criticizing the church, and after questioning the sources of the article, the Dean of Religious Life, Revd. Elizabeth Davenport, Senior Associate Dean of Religious Life, and Sherry Caudle, Administrator for the Office of Religious Life, wrote a letter to the editor. The school officials said that the author's information was "outdated and misleading." They said "the church is unfairly and incorrectly identified" as a problem group. They also said that the truth is "the church has been a very positive influence in the lives of the USC students in recent years."

Court cases 
The Central Christian Church in Singapore, a part of the ICOC family of churches, won a court case (SINGAPORE HIGH COURT – SUIT NOs 846 and 848 of 1992 Judges LAI KEW CHAI J Date 29 August 1994 Citation [1995] 1 SLR 115) in which the judge ruled against a newspaper that had accused the Church of being a cult. An expert on religious studies testified that the Central Christian Church's practices were "neither strange, unnatural or harmful."

On December 31, 2022, the ICOC along with Kip McKean and the International Christian Churches were named in a legal suit of alleged sexual abuse by members, Anthony M. Stowers et al v. International Churches of Christ, Inc. et al. The group has also been accused of covering up additional sexual assaults by one of the victims. One of the victims, Michele Roland, accused the group of not only committing sexual abuse of women and children by Kip McKean but also that the group deliberately enabling the abuse.

Affiliated organizations
Multiple ICOC churches have a Chemical Recovery Ministry aimed at helping people with addictions to alcohol, drugs and nicotine.

The Chemical Recovery ministry started in New York with the help of Steve and Lisa Johnson. As a result of many struggling due to chemical dependency, an organization was created to help members suffering from addiction, recapture their relationship with Christ through a guided course, using a book called, "Some Sat in Darkness'". Today the CR ministry continues to flourish especially in larger cities like Seattle, where a thriving group led by Paul Martin (a Deacon of the Seattle Church of Christ Family) holds a monthly open house.

The following institutions are operated or managed by the ICOC:

 Disciples Today - The official communications and news hub of the ICOC 
 ICOC Leaders - Leadership news and events
 Keydogo - Video Production Company
 Illumination Publishers International (IPI) — Christian writing and audio teaching
 Baltic Nordic Missions Alliance
 European Bible School
 Florida Missions Council
 International Missions Society, Inc. (IMS)
 Taiwan Mission Adventure
 Ministry Training Academy
 Strength in Weakness
 Pure and Simple Ministry

See also

 Churches of Christ
 History of Christianity
 Restorationism
 Second Great Awakening
 Non-denominational Christianity
 John Oakes (apologist)

References

External links

 
 Official history
 News and opinion on the ICOC
 Not Your 'Church Next Door': 'Cult' Ignored Abuse, Ran 'Pyramid Scheme,' Lawsuit Claims
 Unanswered Prayers: The Story of One Woman Leaving the International Church of Christ - Washingtonian
   
 Igreja de Cristo Internacional de São Paulo  
 International Churches of Christ 
 Igreja de Cristo Internacional de Guaianases – Cifras de música e louvor 
  
 London International Church of Christ on LinkedIn 
 Hope Worldwide on LinkedIn 

Arminian denominations
Christian denominations established in the 20th century
Christian missions
Christian new religious movements
Churches of Christ
Evangelical denominations in North America
Fundamentalist denominations
Religious organizations established in the 1980s